Unity is an unincorporated community in Franklin County, in the U.S. state of Georgia.

History
The name "Unity" is biblical in origin; it is mentioned in Ephesians 4.

References

Unincorporated communities in Georgia (U.S. state)
Unincorporated communities in Franklin County, Georgia